Trieste Airport  is an international airport located  west of Ronchi dei Legionari (Province of Gorizia), near Trieste in Venezia Giulia, north-eastern Italy. The airport has a catchment area of approximately 5 million people, stretching beyond the Friuli-Venezia Giulia region into neighboring Slovenia, Austria and Croatia.

Overview
The first official documents citing the airfield of Ronchi dei Legionari date back to 30 November 1935, when the 4th Fighter Wing of the Royal Italian Air Force was based here. Commercial operations officially began on 2 December 1961. In 2016 the airport was officially renamed Trieste Airport. In recent years the airport has witnessed growth in low-cost and cargo traffic.

The airport is owned and operated by Aeroporto Friuli Venezia Giulia S.p.A., a jointly owned company controlled by F2i and the Friuli-Venezia Giulia government.

Airlines and destinations
The following airlines operate regular scheduled and charter flights to and from Trieste:

Statistics

Ground Transportation

The airport is connected to the national railway and highway networks thanks to the Intermodal Transit Hub completed in March 2018, serving as an air-road-rail interchange.

Rail
Trieste Airport railway station links the passenger terminal directly to the Venice–Trieste railway thanks to a 425-meter long raised walkway.

Road
A bus terminal with 16 platforms, a multi-storey car park with 500 lots and a grade level car park with 1000 lots provide rapid access to and from the A4 Trieste-Turin highway for public and private motor vehicles. In the southern direction, this highway also offers connections to Slovenia's A1 Motorway with two crossings at Fernetti and Rabuiese, linking the airport with the highway networks in Croatia, Hungary and the Balkans. At the interchange near Palmanova, the A4 branches off to Autostrada A23 linking to Austria's Süd Autobahn A2 via Udine and Tarvisio.

References

External links

 Official website
 

Trieste
Airports in Italy
Transport in Friuli-Venezia Giulia
Buildings and structures in the Province of Gorizia